Fábio Kolling, nickname Pinho (born 9 October 1985) is a Brazilian footballer who plays for São Luiz. He spent most of season in Rio Grande do Sul, Brazil.

Biography
Kolling signed a contract with Novo Hamburgo in January 2006 until the end of 2006 Campeonato Gaúcho. In March, he left for São Paulo de Rio Grande of Campeonato Gaúcho Segunda Divisão. He extended his contract with Novo Hamburgo in July (until the end of Série C) but returned to São Paulo de Rio Grande in September, for Copa FGF. He played his only Série C match on 6 August 2006, winning Marcílio Dias 2–0, the last group stage of the league, as substitute.
 
Kolling was transferred to FC Sopron in 2007. He then spent 2 seasons in Challenge League side Concordia Basel.

Kolling returned to Brazil in December 2009 and played for Avenida in 2010 Campeonato Gaúcho. In April, he left for Passo Fundo and in August for amateur side Gramadense. In November 2010 he was re-signed by Avenida until the end of 2011 Campeonato Gaúcho but left for São Luiz in January 2011.

References

External links
 CBF Contract Record 
 

Brazilian footballers
Esporte Clube Novo Hamburgo players
Sport Club São Paulo players
FC Sopron players
FC Concordia Basel players
Esporte Clube Avenida players
Esporte Clube São Luiz players
Brazilian expatriate footballers
Expatriate footballers in Hungary
Expatriate footballers in Switzerland
Brazilian expatriate sportspeople in Hungary
Brazilian expatriate sportspeople in Switzerland
Association football midfielders
Brazilian people of German descent
Sportspeople from Rio Grande do Sul
1985 births
Living people